Thysia wallichii is a species of beetle in the family Cerambycidae, and the only species in the genus Thysia. It was described by Hope in 1831.

References

Ceroplesini
Beetles described in 1831
Monotypic beetle genera